The Canadian Assemblies of God (CAOG) (formerly the Italian Pentecostal Church of Canada or IPCC) is a Pentecostal denomination in Canada. It is one of three Canadian branches of the Assemblies of God, the world's largest Pentecostal denomination. The group shares identical beliefs and close cooperation with the Pentecostal Assemblies of Canada. It is also associated with the Assemblies of God in Italy and the Christian Church of North America.

History
It began in a Pentecostal ministry among Italian Canadians extending back to 1912. The Italian Pentecostal Church of Canada was founded in 1944. In 2005, the denomination took its current name.

References

External links
Official Website

Assemblies of God National Fellowships
Finished Work Pentecostals
Pentecostal denominations in North America
Christian denominations in Canada
Christian organizations established in the 20th century
Italian-Canadian culture